Laurențiu Tudor (born 17 August 1997) is a Romanian professional footballer who plays as a midfielder for Pandurii Târgu Jiu.

References

External links
 
 

1997 births
Living people
Romanian footballers
Liga I players
CS Pandurii Târgu Jiu players
Liga II players
FC Ripensia Timișoara players
Association football midfielders